Anorus parvicollis is a species of soft-bodied plant beetle in the family Dascillidae. It is found in North America.

References

Further reading

 

Polyphaga
Articles created by Qbugbot
Beetles described in 1894